R.E.O. Speedwagon is the debut studio album by American rock band REO Speedwagon. Released in 1971, it was the only album recorded with singer Terry Luttrell, who would go on to join Starcastle. Kevin Cronin joined the band for R.E.O./T.W.O. This album concluded with a progressive rock song unlike the later arena rock songs that made them famous.

History
The album produced the fan favorites “157 Riverside Avenue”, “Sophisticated Lady” and “Lay Me Down”, but sold very poorly, though “Sophisticated Lady” did reach number 122 on the singles charts. “157 Riverside Avenue” and “Lay Me Down” were subsequently recorded on the live album Live: You Get What You Play For. “157 Riverside Avenue” and “Sophisticated Lady” were both featured on the compilation album A Decade of Rock and Roll: 1970-1980. In 2007, the British company BGO Records released REO Speedwagon and R.E.O./T.W.O. together (BGOCD775), marking the first time the band's first album was widely available in CD format. For some unknown reason, Epic Records never issued this first album on the cassette tape format (but they did issue an 8-Track Stereo Tape Cartridge version of it).

Track listing
All songs written by Neal Doughty, Alan Gratzer, Terry Luttrell, Gregg Philbin, and Gary Richrath.

Side one
"Gypsy Woman's Passion"  – 5:17
"157 Riverside Avenue"  – 3:57
"Anti-Establishment Man"  – 5:21
"Lay Me Down"  – 3:51

Side two
"Sophisticated Lady"  – 4:00
"Five Men Were Killed Today"  – 3:00
"Prison Women"  – 2:36
"Dead at Last"  – 10:08

Personnel
REO Speedwagon
Terry Luttrell - lead vocals
Gary Richrath - guitar
Neal Doughty - keyboards
Gregg Philbin - bass, backing vocals
Alan Gratzer - drums, backing vocals

Additional personnel
Andre Borly - organ (track 6)
Freedom Soul Singers - backing vocals (track 8)

Charts
Singles - Billboard (United States)

Release history

References

REO Speedwagon albums
1971 debut albums
Albums produced by Paul Leka
Epic Records albums